Presa-Tusiu is an archaeological site in Corsica. It is located in the commune of Altagène.

Archaeological sites in Corsica